Cinematic fight choreography or staged fights in cinema include performances of archery, classical fencing, historical fencing, martial arts, close combat, and duels in general, as well as choreography of full-scale battles with hundreds of combatants.

Asian martial arts

The 1970s in Hong Kong saw the rise and sudden death of international martial arts and film superstar Bruce Lee, who is known for popularizing Hong Kong action cinema. He was succeeded in the 1980s by Jackie Chan, who popularized the use of comedy and dangerous stunts in action films.

Hong Kong-based fight choreographer Yuen Wo-ping is famed for his work on Crouching Tiger, Hidden Dragon and the Matrix trilogy, in which the often unrealistic fighting techniques are complemented by directorial techniques such as bullet time. Ching Siu-tung is particularly noted in the field of Hong Kong action cinema for his use of graceful wire fu techniques.

Notable Asian martial arts choreographers:
Yoshio Sugino
Bruce Lee
Don Wilson
Jackie Chan
Yayan Ruhian
Donnie Yen
Sammo Hung
Panna Rittikrai
Tony Jaa
Dan Inosanto
Ji Chang-Wook 
Iko Uwais

Notable Asian martial arts actors:
Bruce Lee 
Donnie Yen
Jackie Chan
Jet Li 
Ji Chang-Wook
Tony Jaa
Iko Uwais

Awards
 Golden Horse Award for Best Action Choreography
 Hong Kong Film Award for Best Action Choreography

Battles

With the introduction of advanced editing techniques and of filming outdoors, modern films have a much wider palette of possibilities for depicting violence, including single combat, brawls, and melees as well as large-scale battles. From the 2000s, computer animation has come to play an important part in cinematic visualization of battle scenes, chiefly through the use of computer-generated imagery to simulate very large battles appearing to involve thousands of individual combatants and coordinated activities, which would otherwise be logistically difficult or prohibitively expensive to depict (see MASSIVE and crowd simulation). Many battlefield CGI techniques were pioneered from 2001 by The Lord of the Rings film trilogy.

Historical battles
Films with notable large battle scenes and the historical battles/wars they depict:
Prehistory and ancient history
Spartacus (1960) – Third Servile War
The 300 Spartans (1962) – Battle of Thermopylae
Gladiator (2000) – Marcomannic Wars
Troy (2004) – Trojan War
Alexander (2004) – Battle of Gaugamela, Battle of the Hydaspes
King Arthur (2004) – Battle of Mons Badonicus
300 (2007) – Battle of Thermopylae
Red Cliff (2008, 2009) – Battle of Red Cliffs
Post-classical and medieval history
Alexander Nevsky (1938) – Battle on the Ice
El Cid (1961) – Siege of Valencia during the Reconquista
Kagemusha (1980) – Battle of Takatenjin, Battle of Nagashino
Henry V (1989) – Battle of Agincourt
Braveheart (1995) – Battle of Stirling Bridge, Battle of Falkirk (1298)
The Messenger: The Story of Joan of Arc (1999) – Siege of Orléans
Kingdom of Heaven (2005) – Battle of Hattin, Siege of Jerusalem (1187)
Elizabeth: The Golden Age  (2007) – Battle of Gravelines
Arn – The Knight Templar (2007) – Battle of Montgisard
Early modern period to 19th century
Zulu (1964) – Battle of Rorke's Drift
War and Peace (1968) – Battle of Borodino
The Charge of the Light Brigade  (1968) – Battle of Balaklava
Waterloo (1970) – Battle of Waterloo
Glory (1989) – Second Battle of Fort Wagner
Gettysburg (1993) – Battle of Gettysburg
The Patriot (2000) – Battle of Cowpens
The Last Samurai (2003) – Satsuma Rebellion
The Alamo (2004) – Battle of the Alamo
Alatriste (2006) – Battle of Rocroi
The Sovereign's Servant (2007) – Battle of Poltava
20th century
The Longest Day (1962) – Invasion of Normandy
Battle of the Bulge (1965) – Battle of the Bulge
Liberation, Oszvobozdeniye (1969) – Battle of Kursk, Battle of Berlin
Tora! Tora! Tora! (1970) – Attack on Pearl Harbor
March on the Drina (1964) – Battle of Cer
Battle of Neretva (1969) – Battle of Neretva
Cross of Iron (1977) – Eastern Front (World War II)
A Bridge Too Far (1977) – Battle of Arnhem
Full Metal Jacket (1987) – Battle of Hue
Hamburger Hill (1987) – Battle of Hamburger Hill
Border (1997) – Battle of Longewala
Stalingrad (1993) – Battle of Stalingrad
Saving Private Ryan (1998) – Invasion of Normandy (Omaha Beach, Dog Green sector)
The Thin Red Line (1998) – Battle of Guadalcanal
When Trumpets Fade (1998) – Battle of Hurtgen Forest
Enemy at the Gates (2001) – Battle of Stalingrad
Pearl Harbor (2001) – Attack on Pearl Harbor, Doolittle Raid
Black Hawk Down (2001) – Battle of Mogadishu
We Were Soldiers (2002) – Battle of Ia Drang
Windtalkers (2002) – Battle of Saipan
Tango Charlie (2005) – various aspects of Naxalite-Maoist insurgency and Insurgency in Jammu and Kashmir
Lakshya (2004) – Kargil War
Flags of our Fathers (2006) – Battle of Iwo Jima
Letters from Iwo Jima (2006) – Battle of Iwo Jima

Fantasy and science fiction
Harry Potter (film series)
Star Wars (1977–2019)
Starship Troopers (1997)
The Lord of the Rings film trilogy (2001–2003) – Battle of the Hornburg, Battle of the Pelennor Fields, Battle of the Morannon
Maleficent (2014)

Boxing

Fencing
Cinema inherited the concept of choreographed fights directly from the theatrical fight. Films that feature notable classical fencing scenes include:
The Mark of Zorro (1920)
The Three Musketeers (1921)
Don Q, Son of Zorro (1925)
The Black Pirate (1926)
The Iron Mask (1929)
Captain Blood (1935)
The Prisoner of Zenda (1937)
The Adventures of Robin Hood (1938)
The Sea Hawk (1940)
The Mark of Zorro (1940)
The Corsican Brothers (1941)
The Black Swan (1942)
Adventures of Don Juan (1948)
Cyrano de Bergerac (1950)
Scaramouche (1952)
At Sword's Point (1952)
The Court Jester (1956)
Le Bossu (1959)
Le Miracle des loups (1961)
The Great Race (1965)
The Three Musketeers (1973)
The Four Musketeers (1974)
The Duellists (1977)
The Princess Bride (1987)
Cyrano de Bergerac (1990)
Robin Hood: Prince of Thieves (1991)
By the Sword (1991)
The Fencing Master (1992)
Rob Roy (1995)
On Guard (1997)
The Mask of Zorro (1998)
The Count of Monte Cristo (2002)
Die Another Day (2002)
Pirates of the Caribbean: The Curse of the Black Pearl (2003)

Douglas Fairbanks in 1920 was the first film director to ask a fencing master to assist the production of a fencing scene in cinema. A second wave of swashbuckling films was triggered with Errol Flynn from 1935.
Also notable in the early period were Ramon Novarro, Rudolph Valentino, and John Barrymore. Fencing masters (fight arrangers) from the time include Henry Uttenhove, Fred Cavens, Ralph Faulkner, Jean Heremans, Bob Anderson, William Hobbs, and Claude Carliez.

Renewed interest in swashbuckling films arose in the 1970s, in the wake of The Three Musketeers (1973). Directors at this stage aimed for a certain amount of historical accuracy, although, as the 2007 Encyclopædia Britannica puts it, "movie fencing remains a poor representation of actual fencing technique". A notable fight arranger of this period is William Hobbs.

Firearms

Knife fights
Knife fights, as well as knife-throwing stunts, are staged for dramatic effect in action films. In Under Siege, Commando, Gangs of New York, Machete, and Machete Kills, knife fights are shown as climactic battles. A common theme in such films is for the hero to discard a gun or similarly superior weapon, in order to engage the otherwise unarmed villain in "fair" knife-to-knife combat. In the 2002 film version of The Count of Monte Cristo, the main character, Dantes, agrees to engage in a knife fight against Jacopo, a member of a smuggler's crew (the captain of which calls Jacopo "the best knife fighter I have ever seen"). Dantes defeats Jacopo but spares his life, gaining a pivotal ally in his future endeavors. 

One of the most famous cinematic knife fights occurs in From Here to Eternity. The scene—occurring in a back alley—is stark and realistic, lacks background music and uses pitch black shadow.

In the movie Force 10 from Navarone, a knife fight appeared between Sgt. Weaver, an African-American medic Soldier, played by Carl Weathers, and Capt. Drazak, an officer of the Chetniks, allies to Nazi Germany, played by Richard Kiel. The fight ended with Drazak's death.

In the film Commando, starring Arnold Schwarzenegger, there is a knife fight at the end of the movie between  John Matrix (Arnold Schwarzenegger) and Bennett played by Vernon Wells. They begin with the knife, and then end up in a No-holds-barred CQC.

In the film Cobra, starring Sylvester Stallone as a city cop who must stop a knife using serial killer and cult member the Night Slasher played by Brian Thompson. There is a fight scene at the end involving a knife fight between Stallone's character Cobra and the Night Slasher. The menacing looking knife used by the Night Slasher is a brass knuckles or more like a spiked knuckles, modern version of a trench knife.

The film Eastern Promises has a rather intense knife fight that rivals that of the also psychologically disturbing knife fight scene from Saving Private Ryan.

In The Bourne Identity (2002 film), Jason Bourne (played by Matt Damon) had a knife-fight encounter with Castel, an assassin sent to kill him.  In the struggle, Jason Bourne equalizes his unarmed position against the assassin's knife by arming himself with a pen.

In Kill Bill, a knife-fight occurs between the Bride and Vernita Green, during which the pair severely damage Green's living room, only to abruptly halt when Green's daughter is dropped off by the school bus and seen walking towards the house. Shortly thereafter, Green sneakily pulls a gun, and the Bride responds by throwing her knife, to deadly effect.

The Hunted (2003, William Friedkin) was a unique film that put an emphasis on showing knife combat.  Starring Benicio del Toro and Tommy Lee Jones, each character has a special affinity for knives, due to participating in various special operations missions under military service, which required use of a knife as a primary weapon. Also Friedkin's Bug (2007) features a knife-fight.

A Grande Arte (1991) along with the above-mentioned The Hunted, is one of the rare films to focus on knife combat and features training scenes as well.

Dune (1984, David Lynch) and the 2000 Dune miniseries, based on Frank Herbert´s bestselling science fiction novel Dune, show a world where a corporeal shield (a force-field projector) makes laser and projectile weapons useless. Because of that, wars and duels are settled by knife-fighting, which is altered by the presence of the shield: a fast-moving knife bounces off the shield; a slow-moving knife can penetrate the shield to reach a vital organ. The climactic duel, between Paul Muad´dib and Feyd-Rautha, used only knives (no shields) and martial-arts abilities.

Michael Jackson's music video Beat it features a highly stylized depiction of two men knife-fighting using switchblade knives, with their wrists tied. This is reminiscent of a similar depiction in West Side Story.

In Quantum of Solace (2008) James Bond (Daniel Craig) enters the apartment of Edmund Slate, the man he was sent to investigate. Slate comes out of nowhere and tries to kill him with a switchblade. They struggle, Bond arms himself with scissors, disarms Slate by bending his wrist forward, and stabs him in the neck and femoral artery, causing Slate to bleed to death.

In The Expendables, Lee Christmas (played by Jason Statham) frequently makes use of combat knives when he is not in possession of a firearm and uses them both as projectiles and in hand-to-hand combat. Gunner (Dolph Lundgren) also uses a large bowie knife but gives it to Lee at the beginning of the film.

In The Expendables 2, Lee Christmas again makes use of combat knives. He is shown to be skillful enough to defeat a squad of enemies on his own, as well as challenge the villain Hector (played by Scott Adkins), himself a formidable knife-fighter. Hector pulls his knife on Christmas when the latter runs out of blades; he arms himself with a pair of brass knuckles, with which he fights and defeats Hector.

In The Man From Nowhere, Cha Tae-Shik (played by Won Bin) makes use of a switchblade and the art form kali to combat gangsters in a large condominium towards the finale of the film. After defeating the gangsters, he fights their hired assassin who also wields a karambit. Both fighters fight close quarters until Cha Tae-Shik gains the upper hand and stabs the hired assassin in the heart.

In The Avengers, Hawkeye (played by Jeremy Renner) fights Black Widow (played by Scarlett Johansson) while under the influence of Loki. When deprived of his bow, Hawkeye draws his knife and continues the fight until he is disarmed and incapacitated.

In Captain America: The Winter Soldier, during the first encounter between Steve Rogers (played by Chris Evans and the titular antagonist (played by Sebastian Stan), the Winter Soldier uses multiple knives against Rogers in their melee along with various firearms.

In The Birth of a Nation (2016 film), the film provided various hand-to-hand close combat  and knife combat techniques in a climactic “last stand” battle scene, showing Nat Turner (played by Nate Parker) and his group of slave rebels facing the militia and plantation defenders at an armory.

Historical martial arts
Historical martial arts reconstruction developed in the later 20th century and became influential in cinema only from ca. the 1990s. Earlier sequences of combat with pre-Renaissance weaponry were typically based on classical fencing techniques, or choreographed as ad-hoc "blade whacking".

Influential movie heralding renewed interest in pre-modern swordsmanship were Excalibur (1981) and Highlander (1986). Lightsaber combat in the Star Wars films takes some elements from kendo, and The Lord of the Rings employs some elements of historical fencing.

Historical drama films that feature combat based on historical swordsmanship include
Rob Roy (1995), Gladiator (2000), Troy (2004), Kingdom of Heaven (2005), Alatriste (2006).

A Knight's Tale is an example of a movie that includes jousting performances (2001) and unrealistic clashing of swords on armor, despite the Fechtbücher who show armoured combat (Harnischfechten).

Unarmed or improvised combat
Films such as The Duellists, fight directed by William Hobbs, Once Were Warriors, fight directed by Robert Bruce and Troy, fight directed by Richard Ryan are widely famed for including gritty, realistic combat scenes.

References

External links

Film
Cinematography
Special effects
 
 
 
 
Action choreographers